The non-marine molluscs of Guatemala are a part of the molluscan wildlife of Guatemala. A number of species of non-marine molluscs are found in the wild in Guatemala.

Land gastropods 

Helicinidae
 Helicina rostrata Morelet, 1851

Cyclophoridae
 Adelopoma stolli Martens, 1890

Oleacinidae
 Streptostyla turgidula Pfeiffer, 1856

Sagdidae
 Xenodiscula taintori Goodrich & Schalie, 1937

See also
 List of marine molluscs of Guatemala

Lists of molluscs of surrounding countries:
 List of non-marine molluscs of Mexico, Wildlife of Mexico
 List of non-marine molluscs of Belize, Fauna of Belize
 List of non-marine molluscs of Honduras, Wildlife of Honduras
 List of non-marine molluscs of El Salvador, Wildlife of El Salvador

References

M
Guatemala
Molluscs
Guatemala
Guatemala
Guatemala